Erwin Hari (born 16 October 1933) is a Swiss cross-country skier. He competed in the men's 15 kilometre event at the 1956 Winter Olympics.

References

1933 births
Living people
Swiss male cross-country skiers
Olympic cross-country skiers of Switzerland
Cross-country skiers at the 1956 Winter Olympics
Place of birth missing (living people)
20th-century Swiss people